A Murder in the Glee Club is the second album released by the 1990s Halifax, Nova Scotia rock group Sandbox. It is a concept album revolving around the storyline of a murderer haunted by his actions.  The final track of their previous album, "...and the Mood Changes" from Bionic, has a spoken word segment that is meant as a direct lead-in to this album.

Track listing
 "A Murder in the Glee Club" – 0:53
 "...to Red" – 3:52
 "Spin" – 4:15
 "The Garden Song" – 3:53
 "The Specter" – 4:08
 "Melt" – 3:13
 "If I Tell" – 4:56
 "Self-contained" – 3:49
 "Carry" – 3:06
 "Missed the Day" – 3:28
 "Bear Bear" – 4:11
 "How I Feel" – 3:57
 "A Question of Faith" – 6:32

References

1997 albums
Sandbox (band) albums
Concept albums
Songs about death